Powell Aguirre (born April 10, 2000), known by the stage name Surf Mesa, is an American electronic musician from Seattle. He gained fame for the single "ILY (I Love You Baby)" (2019), a song which sampled a cover of Frankie Valli's "Can't Take My Eyes Off You" (1967) and gained popularity on TikTok.

Biography 

Aguirre was born in Seattle, and is the son of jazz saxophonist Tony Aguirre. He has been making music since the third grade of elementary school, first learning through FL Studio and production tutorials on YouTube. He began working on the Surf Mesa project in high school, releasing music on SoundCloud. As Aguirre was planning a move to Arizona to study computer science at a technology school, he broke his leg and was bed-bound for three months. During this time, Aguirre was able to focus fully on producing music.

Aguirre decided to move to Los Angeles after visiting a girl he was interested in, as he realized the opportunities for musicians in the city. In 2019, Aguirre released his debut single "Taken Away" featuring Alexa Danielle, and his debut extended play Bedroom. In November, Aguirre released "ILY (I Love You Baby)", a song based on singer Emilee's cover of "Can't Take My Eyes Off You". The song gained massive popularity on video platform TikTok, leading to Aguirre being signed by Astralwerks and Universal. By June 2020, the song had become an international hit, reaching the top 10 in Austria, Germany, Switzerland, Scotland, the Netherlands, Malaysia and Singapore, and the top 5 of the Billboard Hot Dance/Electronic Songs chart.

In June 2020, Aguirre released an official remix for American electronic musician Marshmello and American singer Halsey's "Be Kind".

Discography

Extended plays

Singles

Remixes

Notes

References

2000 births
Living people
21st-century American male musicians
American electronic musicians
American DJs
Astralwerks artists
Downtempo musicians
Musicians from Seattle